Minaki Aerodrome  is a registered aerodrome located  west southwest of Minaki, Ontario, Canada.

See also

 Minaki/Pistol Lake Water Aerodrome

References

Registered aerodromes in Kenora District